Johann Schmidt may refer to:

 Johann Adam Schmidt (1759–1809), German-Austrian surgeon and ophthalmologist
 Johann Friedrich Julius Schmidt (1825–1884), German astronomer and geophysicist
 Johann Georg Schmidt (painter) (1685–1748), German painter
 Johann Georg Schmidt (engraver) (1694–1767), German engraver
 Johann George Schmidt (1707–1774), German master builder, architect in Dresden
 Johann Caspar Schmidt (1806–1856), the full name of Max Stirner, German philosopher
 Red Skull, a fictional Marvel Comics supervillain born Johann Schmidt
 Johann Schmidt (historian) (1693–1762), Moravian historian at Palacký University, Olomouc
 Johann Schmidt (neurologist), physician recognized for early research in neurology after Marc Dax
 Johann Schmidt (organist), organist who instructed Johann Peter Kellner in 1720

See also
 Johan Schmidt (born 1964), Belgian pianist
 Johannes Schmidt (disambiguation)
 John Smith (disambiguation)